These are lists of invasive species by country or region. A species is regarded as invasive if it has been introduced by human action to a location, area, or region where it did not previously occur naturally (i.e., is not a native species), becomes capable of establishing a breeding population in the new location without further intervention by humans, and becomes a pest in the new location, threatening agriculture and/or the local biodiversity.

The term invasive species refers to a subset of those species defined as introduced species, for which see List of introduced species.

List of invasive species in Africa
 List of invasive species in South Africa
List of invasive plant species in South Africa
List of invasive species in Asia
Invasive species in Japan
Invasive species in the Philippines
List of invasive species in Australasia
List of invasive species in Australia
Invasive species in New Zealand
List of invasive species in Europe
Invasive species in the British Isles
List of invasive non-native species in England and Wales
List of invasive species in Italy
List of invasive species in Portugal
List of invasive species in Ukraine
List of invasive species in North America
Invasive grasses of North America
Invasive species in the United States
List of invasive species in California
List of invasive plant species in California
List of invasive species in Florida
List of invasive species in the Everglades
List of invasive marine fish in Florida
List of invasive plant species in Florida
List of invasive plant species in Arizona
List of invasive plant species in the Indiana Dunes
List of invasive plant species in Maryland
List of invasive plant species in Nevada
List of invasive plant species in New Jersey
List of invasive plant species in New Mexico
List of invasive plant species in New York
List of invasive species in Texas
List of invasive plant species in Utah
List of invasive plant species in West Virginia
List of invasive plant species in Wisconsin
Invasive species in Hawaii
List of invasive plant species in Hawaii
Invasive species in South America
List of invasive species in Colombia

See also
 List of globally invasive species
 List of introduced bird species
 List of introduced mammal species
 List of introduced species
 Introduced species

External links
ISSG Database: List of all species
 National Invasive Species Information Center, National Invasive Species Information Center, United States National Agricultural Library. Lists general information and resources for invasive species.
 Threatened Island Biodiversity database (TIB)